The lexis of Bulgarian, a South Slavic language, consists of native words, as well as borrowings from Russian, French, and to a lesser extent English, Greek, Ottoman Turkish, Arabic and other languages.

Native lexical items 
Around three-quarters of the vocabulary in the standard academic dictionaries of Bulgarian consist of native lexical items. Some 2,000 of these items are directly inherited from proto-Slavonic through Old and Middle Bulgarian. These include much of the most common and basic vocabulary of the language, for example body parts (Bulgarian: ръка “hand”) or cardinal numbers (Bulg.: две “two”). The number of words derived from the direct reflexes of proto-Slavonic is more than 20 times greater, accounting for more than 40,000 entries (for example, ръчен “manual”; двуместен “double-place”).

The old Bulgar language has otherwise left only slight traces in Modern Bulgarian. Apart from a small corpus of proper names (for example, Борис “Boris”; Крум “Krum”) and military and administrative titles from the time of the First Bulgarian Empire, only a handful of Bulgar words has survived in Modern Bulgarian. Words which are considered to be almost certainly of Bulgar origin are, for example: бъбрек “kidney”, бисер “pearl”, кумир “idol”, чертог “castle”. Some of these words even spread to other Slavic languages through Old Church Slavonic.

Patterns of borrowing
As of the beginning of the 1960s, loanwords amounted to some 25% of the vocabulary of the standard dictionary of Bulgarian. 
The most important source of loanwords in recent centuries has been Russian. Two other important sources of borrowing were Latin and Medieval and Modern Greek, each accounting for around a quarter of all borrowings. French vocabulary contribution to the Bulgarian language totals around 15% and Ottoman Turkish (along with Arabic and Persian) totalled around 14%, whereas loanwords from Russian accounted for 10% of the borrowings. Lesser but still significant influence was exerted by Italian (around 4%), German (around 4%) and English (around 2%).

Character of borrowing
Loanwords from Greek were the first to enter the lexis of Bulgarian, as early as the time of Old Bulgarian, (for example, икона “icon” or патриарх “patriarch”) as a product of the influence of the liturgical language of the Orthodox Church. During the period of Ottoman rule, Bulgarian adopted from Greek both common lexical material (хиляда “a thousand”) and international vocabulary of Greek origin (граматика “grammar”). The loanwords from Latin were adopted into the language mainly in the second half of the 19th and the first half of the 20th centuries, many Latin terms entered the language through Romanian, Aromanian, and Megleno-Romanian during Bulgarian Empires. The vast majority of them are international terms in the areas of politics, civil administration, medicine, law, etc. (for example, администрация “administration”). Borrowings from French cover a similar time span and are concentrated in the areas of social and political life, military affairs, cooking, the arts, etc. (бюфет “buffet”). 

Loanwords from Turkish (and through Turkish from Arabic and Persian) are a legacy of the period of Ottoman rule (1422–1878) and are divided into two stylistic layers. The first one is neutral and is represented by a corpus of some 800 words, mostly items of clothing, foods and household items (чорап “sock”; чекмедже “drawer”). The remainder consists of colloquial or slightly vulgar terms which occur particularly often in expressive speech and frequently have a humoristic or even pejorative nuance. They generally have neutral native synonyms (cf акъл from Turkish vs ум from common Slavic, both meaning “wits, intelligence”). There is a fluent transition between this group and a large amount of more or less obsolete words that only occur in archaic or dialectal speech. 

English is the only language that has significantly influenced Bulgarian since the 1950s. The share of English borrowings at present is much larger than the 2% in the 1960s and most likely lies between 10% and 15% of all borrowings. The impact of English is particularly strong in technology, sports, dress, the arts, music and popular culture: корнер “corner” (football), пънк “punk”.

As of the beginning of the 1960s, loanwords amounted to some 25% of the vocabulary of the standard dictionary of Bulgarian.  The most frequent source of loanwords in recent centuries has been Russian. Two other important sources of borrowing were Latin and Greek, each accounting for around a quarter of all borrowings, more specifically, Latin (around 26%) and Greek (around 23%). French vocabulary contribution to the Bulgarian language totals around 15% and Ottoman Turkish (along with Arabic and Persian) totalled around 14%, whereas loanwords from Russian accounted for 10% of the borrowings. Lesser but still significant influence was exerted by Italian (around 4%), German (around 4%) and English (around 2%).

Examples
Some very frequent expressions have been borrowed from other languages. Most of them are somewhat informal.
 – Thank you; from French  (although this word is probably even more common than native , it is inappropriate in very official or solemn contexts)
 – Bye; from Italian  (the informal counterpart of native , this word is more common than the native)
 – Super; (from Latin, colloquial; note – "super" remains the same regardless of quantity or gender, although an even more colloquial adjective  does decline as usual)
 – Hello on the phone; from French  (unlike the above, this word is stylistically neutral).

Statistics

Comparison with other Slavic languages
Most Slavic languages demonstrate a higher degree of shared vocabulary with one another than English does with the Germanic family due to the number of Romance loans in English on the one hand, and on the other hand due to the influences on Slavic languages of Russian or Church Slavonic, which was a Southeast Slavic language.  The adoption of Church Slavonic morphology and vocabulary was used to enrich other Slavic languages. It is especially pronounced in Russian, which today consists of mixed native and Church Slavonic (South Slavic) vocabulary, analogically to the Romance vocabulary of English, but in Russian the Church Slavonisms are not perceived as foreign due to their Slavic roots. An estimated 55% of Russian, incl. vocabulary, syntactic features, etc. goes back to the Church Slavonic language, known as Old Bulgarian, while 70% of Church Slavonic words are common to all Slavic languages. Some authors argue that the Southeast Slavic language Church Slavonic is the "passkey" to the Russian nation and language.

See also
Bulgarian language

References

Lexis (linguistics)
Bulgarian language